Lepidogma melaleucalis is a species of snout moth in the genus Lepidogma. It was described by George Hampson in 1906 and is known from Ghana (it was described from Kumassi, Ashanti).

References

Moths described in 1906
Epipaschiinae